Diuris maculata, commonly known as the spotted doubletail, is a species of orchid endemic to New South Wales. It has up to two or three folded leaves and a flowering stem with up to eight yellow flowers with brown to blackish markings. It is similar to D. pardina which has darker flowers with larger brown markings.

Description
The flowers are yellow with dark brown to blackish spots on all flower parts, sometimes on the reverse side. The species is similar to D. pardina but has lighter coloured flowers with smaller brown markings. Flowering occurs from July to November.

Taxonomy and naming
Diuris maculata was first formally described in 1805 by James Edward Smith and the description was published in Volume 1 of his book, Exotic Botany. The specific epithet (maculata) is a Latin word meaning "spotted".

Distribution and habitat
The spotted doubletail grows in shrubby forest and heath between Taree and Eden, mainly in coastal and near-coastal areas.

Ecology
This orchid has been shown to mimic the flowers of several native peas, including Hardenbergia violacea and Daviesia ulicifolia. The native bee Trichocolletes venustus visits both orchid and peas flowers and obtains food from the pea but not from the orchid, which even has a UV nectar guide similar to that on the peas.

References

maculata
Endemic orchids of Australia
Flora of New South Wales
Plants described in 1805